Jan Palach (11 August 1948 – 19 January 1969) was a Czech student of history and political economics at Charles University in Prague.  His self-immolation was a political protest against the end of the Prague Spring resulting from the 1968 invasion of Czechoslovakia by the Warsaw Pact armies.

Death 
In August 1968, the Soviet Union invaded Czechoslovakia to crush the liberalising reforms of Alexander Dubček's government during what was known as the Prague Spring.  Prague-born Palach decided to sacrifice himself in protest of the invasion and set himself on fire, in Wenceslas Square, on 16 January 1969. According to a letter he sent to several public figures, an entire clandestine resistance organization had been established with the purpose of practising self-immolation until their demands were met; however, it seems that such a group never existed. The demands declared in the letter were the abolition of censorship and a halt to the distribution of Zprávy, the official newspaper of the Soviet occupying forces. In addition, the letter called for the Czech and the Slovak peoples to go on a general strike in support of these demands. An earlier draft of the letter that Palach wrote also called for the resignation of a number of pro-Soviet politicians, but that demand did not make it into the final version, which included the remark that "our demands are not extreme; on the contrary". Palach died from his burns three days after his act, in the hospital. On his deathbed, he was visited by a female acquaintance from his college and by a student leader, to whom he had addressed one of the copies of his letter. It was reported that he had pleaded for others not to do what he had done but instead to continue the struggle by other means, although it has been doubted whether he really said that.

According to Jaroslava Moserová, a burns specialist who was the first to provide care to Palach at the Charles University Faculty Hospital, Palach did not set himself on fire to protest against the Soviet occupation, but did so to protest against the "demoralization" of Czechoslovak citizens caused by the occupation.

The funeral of Palach turned into a major protest against the occupation. A month later (on 25 February), another student, Jan Zajíc, burned himself to death in the same place. This was followed in April of the same year by Evžen Plocek in Jihlava, and by others.  People in other Warsaw Pact countries also emulated his example, such as the Hungarian Sándor Bauer on 20 January 1969 and another Hungarian, Márton Moyses on 13 February 1970.

Palach's self-immolation was the second act of that kind after that of Ryszard Siwiec of Poland, which was successfully suppressed by the authorities and was mostly forgotten until the fall of communism. Palach was not known to be aware of Siwiec's protest.

Posthumous recognition 

Palach was initially interred in Olšany Cemetery in Prague. As his gravesite was becoming a national shrine, the Czechoslovak secret police (StB) set out to destroy any memory of Palach's deed and exhumed his remains during the night of 25 October 1973. They then cremated his body and sent the ashes to his mother in his home town of Všetaty; the body of an anonymous old woman from a rest home was laid in the vacated grave. Palach's mother was not allowed to deposit the urn in the local cemetery until 1974. On 25 October 1990, Palach's ashes were officially returned to his initial gravesite in Prague.

On the 20th anniversary of Palach's death, protests ostensibly in memory of Palach (but intended as criticism of the regime) escalated into what would be called "Palach Week". The series of anticommunist demonstrations in Prague between 15 and 21 January 1989 were suppressed by the police, who beat demonstrators and used water cannons, often catching passers-by in the fray. Palach Week is considered one of the catalyst demonstrations which preceded the fall of communism in Czechoslovakia 10 months later.

After the Velvet Revolution, Palach (along with Zajíc) was commemorated in Prague by a bronze cross embedded at the spot where he fell outside the National Museum, as well as a square named in his honour. The Czech astronomer Luboš Kohoutek, who left Czechoslovakia the following year, named an asteroid which had been discovered on 22 August 1969, after Jan Palach (1834 Palach).  There are several other memorials to Palach in cities throughout Europe, including a small memorial inside the glacier tunnels beneath the Jungfraujoch in Switzerland.

Several later incidents of self-immolation may have been influenced by the example of Palach and his media popularity. In the spring of 2003, a total of six young Czechs burned themselves to death, notably Zdeněk Adamec, a 19-year-old student from Humpolec who burned himself on 6 March 2003 on almost the same spot in front of the National Museum where Palach burnt himself, leaving a suicide note explicitly referring to Palach and the others who killed themselves in the 1969 Prague Spring.

Just walking distance from the site of Palach's self-immolation, a statuary in Prague's Old Town Square honours iconic Bohemian religious thinker Jan Hus, who was burned at the stake for his beliefs in 1415.  Hus himself was celebrated as a national hero for many centuries; some commentary has linked Palach's self-immolation to the execution of Hus.

Cultural references

In music 

The music video for the song "Club Foot" by the band Kasabian is dedicated to Palach. The composition "The Funeral of Jan Palach" performed by The Zippo Band and composed by Phil Kline is a tribute. He is mentioned in The Stranglers' bassist, Jean-Jacques Burnel's 1979 solo album, Euroman Cometh.

In their 1983 song "Nuuj Helde" the Janse Bagge Bend (from the Netherlands) asks whether people know why Jan Palach burned. This song was meant to make the general public aware of heroes.

Norwegian songwriter and singer Åge Aleksandersen mentioned Palach's name in his 1984 song "Va det du Jesus".

Norwegian songwriter Hans Rotmo mentioned Palach's name among other notable political activists such as Victor Jara and Steve Biko in his 1989 song "Lennon Street".

American Metal band Lamb of God wrote a song on their studio album VII: Sturm und Drang, entitled "Torches", that was inspired by Palach's actions.

Italian songwriter Francesco Guccini wrote a song  "La Primavera di Praga" in dedication to Jan Palach, compared to religious scholar Jan Hus: "Once again Jan Hus is burning alive". Polish singer Jacek Kaczmarski wrote a song about Palach's suicide, called "Pochodnie" ("Torches").
The Italian far-right Folk group, "La Compagnia dell'Anello" released a song dedicated to him, titled Jan Palach.

The Luxembourg-based Welsh composer Dafydd Bullock was commissioned to write "Requiem for Jan Palach" (op 182) to commemorate the fortieth anniversary of Palach's suicide. It includes a setting of words which appeared briefly on a statue in Wenceslas Square after the event, before being erased by the authorities: "Do not be indifferent to the day when the light of the future was carried forward by a burning body".

The Spanish composer Jorge Grundman wrote in 2018 his work Jan & Jan for Chorus and Symphonic Orchestra (op 68) as an hommage to Jan Palach and Jan Zajic. The work was premiered at the Spanish National Auditorium of Music in 2019 to commemorate the fifth anniversary of the self-inmolation of both students. The Chorus sings an adaptation the Jan Palach's letter addressing to their families

Israeli Musician, Arik Einstein, sang about the Prague Spring in his 1968 song "Prague", and dedicated a verse to Palach's self-immoltation.

In literature 

In 1969, the Slovenian poet Edvard Kocbek published a poem entitled "Rocket", in which he juxtaposed two events from that year: the Apollo 11 landing, "a senseless act of technological nihilism", and "a rocket named Palach that launched itself into history, its smoky message was seen even through the darkest glasses".

Jan Palach is named in context in the 1992 poem by Axel Reitel, Ústí nad Labem, in: das exil und der sandberg. Gedichte 1976–1990. Boesche-Verlag Berlin und Haifa, referring a school-holiday near Lake Mácha and entertained about this self-immolation against dictatorship. Also include in the collection "Herzflur", Glossen. German Literature after 1945.

Jan Palach is named without context in the 2005 novel by Salman Rushdie, Shalimar the Clown, referring to the 1992 L.A. Riots.

A Pakistani poet Qazi Zafar Iqbal paid tribute to Jan Palach in the form of a Poem in Urdu. The poem is included in his book named "Ghurfa-e-Shab (The Window of Night)" published in 2006 in the city of Lahore.

A sequence of poems exploring the implications of Palach's death called One Match by the poet Sheila Hamilton were published in issue 51 of the Dorset-based poetry serial, Tears in the Fence (ed. David Caddy) in 2010.

Czech poet Miroslav Holub wrote a poem entitled the Prague of Jan Palach (1969) in memory of the martyr. A line from the poem translated into English by George Theiner reads, "where Man ends/ the flame begins."

In film, radio and television 
French documentary filmmaker Raymond Depardon directed a 1969 film about Jan Palach.

Palach featured in a monologue radio play entitled "Torch No 1" on BBC Radio 4, directed by Martin Jenkins, and written by David Pownall. Palach was played by Karl Davies.

A three-part 2013 Czech-Polish television show "Burning Bush", directed by Agnieszka Holland, is situated around the events that happened after Jan Palach's self-immolation.

2018 film "Jan Palach", directed by Robert Sedláček chronicles Palach's life before his self-immolation. Palach is played by Viktor Zavadil.

In fine and performing arts 

After seeking political asylum in the United States, Polish artist Wiktor Szostalo commemorated Jan Palach in his "Performance for Freedom" proclaiming "I am Jan Palach. I'm a Czech, I'm a Pole, a Lithuanian, a Vietnamese, an Afghani, a betrayed You. After I've burnt myself a thousand times, perhaps we'll win".

On the occasion of the 40th anniversary of the death of Jan Palach, a statue sculpted by András Beck as a tribute to the student was transported from France to the Czech Republic. The statue was installed in Mělník, the city where Jan Palach did his studies.

Place names 

In the Czech Republic, many towns have streets or squares named after Palach, including Jan Palach Square in central Prague. He also had streets named after him in Luxembourg City (Luxembourg), Angers and Parthenay (France), Kraków (Poland), Assen, The Hague and Haarlem (Netherlands), Varna (Bulgaria) and Nantwich (United Kingdom). In Rome and Milan (Italy), there is a central square named after Palach with a commemorative statue. In Curepipe (Mauritius), a bus station is named after him.

The oldest rock club in Croatia, situated in Rijeka since 1969, is named Palach. The main bus and metro express terminal in the town of Curepipe, Mauritius is named after Jan Palach. A student hall in Venice, Italy on the Giudecca island has also been given the name of Jan Palach.

See also 
 Jan Zajíc
 Thích Quảng Đức
 Ryszard Siwiec
 Evžen Plocek
 Romas Kalanta
 Oleksa Hirnyk
 Liviu Cornel Babeş
 Mohamed Bouazizi
 List of political self-immolations

References

External links 
 Jan Palach. Charles University Multimedia Project 
  Biography of Jan Palach
 
 "Jan Palach" Sculpture by Gerhard Juchum
 "Jan Palach memorial pages by Radio Praha"
 Document sheds new light on Jan Palach's suicide forty years on, Radio Prague, 12 January 2009

1948 births
1969 suicides
College students who committed suicide
Czech anti-communists
People from Mělník District
People from Prague
Prague Spring
Self-immolations in protest of the Eastern Bloc
Suicides in Czechoslovakia
Recipients of the Order of Tomáš Garrigue Masaryk
Warsaw Pact invasion of Czechoslovakia
Burials at Olšany Cemetery
1969 deaths
Charles University alumni